Heiko Triebener (born November 24, 1964 in Berlin) is a German classical tubist.

Musical education:
since 1983 musicology at University of Tübingen
1982-1992 private studies with Robert Tucci, Bavarian State Opera

Competitions:
1981 & 1983 Jugend musiziert solo national competition each with highest award
1982 & 1983 concerto competition winner Interlochen
1984 International competition Markneukirchen highest award
1984 International Brass Conference Bloomington, Indiana: highest award tuba solo competition

Orchestra musician:
1984-85 German Air Force music corps 1 Neubiberg
1984-86 Radio Symphony Orchestra Saarbrücken
1987-93 Principal Tubist Orchestra of Beethovenhalle Bonn
since 1993 Principal Tubist Bamberg Symphony Orchestra – Bayerische Staatsphilharmonie.

He is well known for winning many competition awards and performing concert tours in Europe and USA.
1987 he founded the German Melton Tuba Quartet and is intermittent member of German Brass.

External links
 Website Melton Tuba Quartet

German classical tubists
1964 births
Living people
21st-century tubists